Puzzle Safari is a one-day team letterboxing event held annually on the Microsoft campus in Redmond, Washington.

There are a maximum of four participants per team. The event takes place over the course of two rounds. Each round, the teams receive a batch of puzzles and a logbook, each of which may be solved to a location on the Microsoft campus. By taking the logbook to that location, the team can find a unique rubber stamp with which they may stamp their logbook. The logbook is turned in and scored at the end of each round.

Puzzles may be anything from traditional puzzles like crosswords, word searches, cryptograms, jigsaw puzzles, word play and logic problems to wandering around campus to find landmarks or puzzles that have to be solved on location.

When arriving at a stamp location, the team may find information about a challenge event. Each year the distribution method for these challenge events change slightly. One common distribution method is a ticket at the stamp location which explains how to find the challenge event at another location. By taking a ticket from this location to the specified challenge event, the team may participate in the event for an opportunity to earn additional points.

Some stamp locations also have additional information, either on what the stamp depicts or in a part of a puzzle at the stamp location. Collecting each part of a puzzle will allow the team to solve a meta-puzzle worth additional points.

Each correctly solved and stamped puzzle from the current round is worth 10 points. First round puzzles solved in the second round are worth 5 points. Secret challenges are worth 20 points each, and meta-puzzles are worth 40 points each. In 2006, the value of meta-puzzles was reduced to 30 points each. In 2007, the value of meta-puzzles was further reduced to 25 points and the value of challenges was increased to 25 points. In 2008, the value of meta-puzzles was reduced to 20 points and challenges were returned to 20 points.

Microsoft has a rich tradition of puzzle events, including Microsoft Puzzle Hunt and Microsoft Intern Puzzle Day, but Microsoft Puzzle Safari provides puzzle solvers with an opportunity to exercise both their mind and their body.

Puzzle Safari
Theme: Jungle and savanna sights and settings, traditional of Africa.

Held: July 21, 2001

Winner: Little Killer Bees

Puzzle Safari 2: Urban Jungle
Theme: Concrete, street signs, and all things urban.

Held: July 13, 2002

Winner: Mini-Suspects

Puzzle Safari 3: Surfin' Safari
Theme: Summer, sand, and the Beach Boys.

Held: July 19, 2003

Winner: The Brute Squad

Puzzle Safari 4: Legend of the Lost Stamp
Theme: Pulp adventure in the vein of Indiana Jones and Allan Quatermain.

Held: July 24, 2004

Winner: Recreation Doormat

Puzzle Safari 5: Around the World in 80 Puzzles
Theme: All things from the works of Jules Verne.

Held: July 16, 2005

Winner: Recreation Doormat (2)

Puzzle Safari 6: 221B Puzzle Street
Theme: Sherlock Holmes

Held: July 8, 2006

Winner: The Brute Squad (2)

Puzzle Safari 007: License to Stamp
Theme: James Bond

Held: July 7, 2007

Winner: The Brute Squad (3)

Puzzle Safari 8: Puzzles in Toyland
Theme: Toys and Board Games

Held: August 2, 2008

Winner: The Brute Squad (4; streak of 3)

Puzzle Safari 9: The Search For Stamps
Theme: Star Trek

Held: August 1, 2009

Winner: The Brute Squad (5; streak of 4)

Puzzle Safari X: Survivor: Puzzle Island
Theme: Survivor and other reality television

Held: July 31, 2010

Winner: S-Words

Puzzle Safari 11: Rock Safari
Theme: Rock Music

Held: July 30, 2011

Winner: Less Than Zero

Puzzle Safari 12: Puzzled In Time
Theme: Time travel

Held: July 14, 2012

Winner: The Brute Squad (6)

Safari the 13th:  I Know What You Solved Last Summer
Theme: Horror/Halloween

Held: July 20, 2013

Winner: The Brute Squad (7)

The Safari Job:  Puzzle Safari 14
Theme: Heist

Held: August 2, 2014

Winner: The Brute Squad (8; streak of 3)

Puzzle Safari 15:  Safari Arcade
Theme: Retro Video Games

Held: August 1, 2015

Winner: Invaders So Meta Even This Acronym

Puzzle Safari 16:  Reorg
Theme: Business

Held: July 23, 2016

Winner: Interorganizationals So Meta Even This Acronym (2)

Puzzle Safari 17:  Fantastic Stamps and Where to Find Them
Theme: Harry Potter and other fantasy/magic

Held: July 15, 2017

Winner (Perfect Score): Incantors So Meta Even This Acronym (3; streak of 3)

Puzzle Safari 18:  Choose Your Own Apocalypse
Theme: Apocalypse

Held: July 21, 2018

Winner (Perfect Score): Illuminati So Meta Even This Acronym (4; streak of 4)

Puzzle Safari 19:  Under Construction
Theme: Construction

Held: July 20, 2019

Joint Winners (Perfect Scores): The Brute Squad (9) & Inconvenience So Meta Even This Acronym (5; streak of 5)

Puzzle Safari 20:  Safari Labs
Theme: Science

Held: July 18, 2020 (remote only, due to pandemic)

Winner (Perfect Score): Isolated So Meta Even This Acronym (6; streak of 6)

Puzzle Safari 21:  Epicurious Enigmas
Theme: Food and Restaurants

Held: July 17, 2021 (remote only, due to pandemic)

Winner (Perfect Score): Sauntering Sloths

Puzzle Safari 22:  The Great Outdoors
Theme: Outdoor recreation

Held: July 16, 2022 (simultaneous in person and remote versions)

Winner (In Person, Perfect Score): 	Indoorsies So Meta Even This Acronym (7)

Winner (Remote, Perfect Score): 	Cat Charts

References
Internal Microsoft website 

Puzzle hunts
Puzzle Safari
Redmond, Washington